Emile Lambiel (born 21 August 1899, date of death unknown) was a Swiss racing cyclist. He rode in the 1927 Tour de France.

References

1899 births
Year of death missing
Swiss male cyclists
Place of birth missing